Al-Jahili Fort is a fort in Al Ain, Abu Dhabi, the United Arab Emirates. The fort was established in 1891 around Al-Jahili Oasis for the protection of palm farmers. Later it was seized by the former Omani coastal scout for its operation to protect the mountain lanes and to preserve the inter-tribal peace. The fort was mentioned and recorded by several historical figures. Percy Cox, in his tour to Al Ain in 1905, reportedly visited the Al Jahili region. In 1906, J. G. Lorimer mentioned that the fort was constructed under the rule of Zayed bin Khalifa Al Nahyan.

Location
The fort is located on the southern part of the city of Al Ain close to Al Ain Castle Museum. It is on the strategic location where exist water sources and agricultural land.

Architecture
Similar in appearance to Mezyad Fort, Jahili Fort is one of the largest castles in the city. It is a part of the bigger complex for public activity which includes public square. There are embrasures and triangular balconies on the top. It has three round watchtowers, and a rectangular watchtower on the northwestern corner. The rectangular tower is considered stronger in terms of defensive capacity.

Restoration
The fort was restored by the Department of Antiquity and Museum in Al Ain during the mid-1980s. It was later restored again by the Abu Dhabi Authority for Culture & Heritage in 2007–2008, during which several infrastructures were put in place, including the visitors' office, gift shops, cafe and wider public square for exhibitions and cultural activities. The fort is planned to be rehabilitated in the future for bigger roles in the tourism and social activity in Al Ain region.

Replica
A replica of the fort exists next to Sheikh Zayed Bridge over the Swat River in the Swat Valley of Pakistan. The model, as well as the bridge, were inaugurated in April 2013.

See also
 Al-Muwaiji Fort
 List of cultural property of national significance in the United Arab Emirates

References

External links

 Al-Jahili Fort, Visit Abu Dhabi

Al-Jahili, Al-Ain
Buildings and structures completed in 1891
Forts and castles in Al Ain